The 2006 Pacific Islanders rugby union tour of Europe was a series of test matches played by the Pacific Islanders team in Wales, Scotland, and Ireland during November 2006.

The Pacific Islanders lost all three test matches against Wales and France, and Ireland. The head coach for the tour was former Samoa player Pat Lam. The captain for the tour was Fijian Simon Raiwalui.

The Matches

Wales

Scotland

Ireland

See also
 2006 end-of-year rugby union tests

References
 
 
 

2006 rugby union tours
2006
2006 in Oceanian rugby union
2006–07 in European rugby union
2006–07 in Irish rugby union
2006–07 in Scottish rugby union
2006–07 in Welsh rugby union
2006
2006
2006
2006